Whitton is a village and civil parish in North Lincolnshire, England. The 2011 census found  212 inhabitants, in 92 households. The parish is bounded on the west by Alkborough, on the east by Winteringham (which also includes the Winteringham Haven Wildlife Reserve) and, to the south, by West Halton.

Toponymy

Cameron and Mills  have suggested that the place name  is an Old English masculine personal name (genitive -n) + Anglian ēg, hence  'Hwita's island of land', but Ekwall thought the name meant ‘White Island’ perhaps assuming wrongly that the ground was chalky.  Gelling pointed out that the settlement is situated on an obvious ēg, i.e. an 'island' of dry land, projecting into the Humber Estuary, and surrounded on east and west by former marshy ground.

History

Whitton may have originated at the time the Romans crossed the Humber northward in 71 AD; first as a military camp and then later as a Roman villa, overlooking the river, with its temple a few yards to the east, where the Church now stands.  It is possible that Whitton was a landing stage on the south bank for the Roman fort and civitas of Petuaria Parisorum at Brough across the river. Roman Coins of Claudius Gothicus (268–270 AD) and Constantine I (the Great) (309–337 AD) have been found in the fields.
Pevsner states that the Church tower "re-uses massive blocks of Roman stone", but these  blocks of millstone grit which are to be found in several local churches (such as neighbouring Winteringham) may have been transported down the Ouse and the Humber from York where Roman buildings were being dismantled, or may even have come from some sort of triumphal arch or structure (perhaps like the Arch of Constantine), which might have stood at the end of Ermine Street.

Whitton is mentioned in the 1086 Domesday Book as "Witenai". Before the Conquest lordship was held by Siward Barn, and after by Saswalo of Ettington, with Henry de Ferrers becoming Tenant-in-chief. The land was valued at seven pounds.

The church is not mentioned in the Domesday survey. The partly Romanesque (or Norman) tower contains three, now untolled, bells; the third bell is said to have been brought from the village of Welton, across the river in Yorkshire. The base of the tower forms a porch and the large tower arch, leading into the nave, is thought to be Romanesque. The font is also ancient and may be from the same period. The church seems to have been almost completely rebuilt in about 1797-8 when the elaborate crocketted pinnacles were removed from the top of the tower. A drawing, by Nattes, of 1794 shows a dilapidated structure with a south aisle and a south porch.

The church was reseated in 1865 at the expense of Lady Strickland, and between about 1892 and 1897 the nave, chancel and roof were entirely rebuilt from the designs of W. & C. A. Bassett-Smith, architects, of London. On the north side of the chancel are two stained-glass windows, erected in 1918 to the memory of Henry Spilman who was killed in the First World War.  In 1952–53 cracks in the tower were repaired under the direction of A.R Haynes, architect of Brigg.

A small part of the relatively new island of Whitton Island in the Humber Estuary falls within the parish.

Census
Census table showing the relative stability of the population:

References

External links

 "Whitton, North Lincolnshire – notes on the history of a village".
 "Whitton", Genuki.org.uk. Retrieved 16 December 2011
 "Whitton Local History Pack", North Lincolnshire Council. Retrieved 16 December 2011

Civil parishes in Lincolnshire
Villages in the Borough of North Lincolnshire